Miriam N. Kotzin is Professor of English at Drexel University, a poet and short-story writer, founding editor of Per Contra, a literary journal, and a contributing editor at Boulevard Magazine edited by Richard Burgin.  Kotzin has published over 120 poems and has been nominated three times for a Pushcart Prize.  She is also the author of over 50 short stories.  She has published several volumes:  three collections of poetry, Reclaiming the Dead (2009), Weights and Measures (2010), and Taking Stock (2011);  and Just Desserts (2010), a collection of short stories.

Kotzin received her B.A. from the University of Pennsylvania (Phi Beta Kappa) and her Ph.D from New York University.  At Drexel University she previously directed Drexel University’s Certificate Program in Writing and Publishing and is also former director of the Literature program.  She has been a juror for the American Film Festival (1973–1982) and judged literary competitions for the Philadelphia Writers' Conference.

References

External links 
 Drexel University Faculty Page
 Reclaiming the Dead
 Word Riot story
 "Remission"
 "Scar"
 How to Write a Sustainable Poem

Living people
Year of birth missing (living people)
Drexel University faculty
University of Pennsylvania alumni
New York University alumni
American women short story writers
American women poets
21st-century American poets
21st-century American women writers
21st-century American short story writers
American women academics